Brioni is an Italian menswear luxury house based in Rome and specialised in sartorial ready-to-wear, leather goods, shoes, eyewear and fragrance, and provides a tailor-made service (Bespoke).

Brioni was founded in Rome in 1945. In 1952, the brand organised the first menswear runway show in the modern history of fashion.  Brioni opened the tailoring school Scuola di Alta Sartoria in Penne, Italia, in 1985. Brioni was acquired by the luxury group Kering in 2011. Mehdi Benabadji is the CEO of Brioni since December 2019, and Norbert Stumpfl the creative director since October 2018.

History

Peacock Revolution 

The first Brioni store, a tailor menswear boutique, was established on Via Barberini 79 in Rome in 1945 by Nazareno Fonticoli and Gaetano Savini. The name Brioni is a reference to the Croatian Brijuni Islands, a vacation destination for European jet-setters.

Brioni was the first tailor for menswear to use bold colors and lighter material, introducing new silhouettes using slimmer shapes with natural shoulders. In 1952, Brioni staged the first menswear fashion show in the modern history of fashion, inside the Sala Bianca at Palazzo Pitti in Florence, where the Peacock Revolution was introduced.  Brioni also invented the trunk show, during which the collections were presented directly in stores, allowing customers to personalize the garments with the Su Misura service (made-to-measure).  Brioni promoted the “total look”, manufacturing suits, hats, ties, shirts and shoes. In 1959, a production plant was opened in Penne, Abruzzo, birth town of Nazareno Fonticoli. Called Brioni Roman Style, the state-of-the-art factory introduced the concept of Prêt Couture, or ready-to-wear Haute Couture that sealed the international rise of the brand.

During the 1950s, Brioni organized fashion shows in 9 US cities which launched the distribution of the brand in the USA. Brioni raised interests from celebrities, heads of state and business leaders. American movie stars of the 1950s such as Clark Gable, John Wayne and Cary Grant wore Brioni suits in Hollywood, giving international exposure to the brand. In 1959, Brioni launched a production plant, the Brioni Roman Style in Penne, which introduced the concept of Prêt Couture that also precipitated the international rise of the brand.

Expansion 

In 1985, the company opened a tailoring school in Penne with the aim of transmitting to younger generations the specific Brioni sartorial method. The same year, Brioni opened a store in New-York's Fisher Building on 52nd Street.

In 1990, Umberto Angeloni was appointed CEO of Brioni. He embarked the company in a diversification of its product lines, from sportswear to womenswear (Lady Brioni) and accessories. Between 1995 and 2001, the company's revenue grew threefold to 150 million dollars. In 2007, Brioni tied a partnership with the Royal College of Art in London to train master tailors through a 3-year program (the partnership ended in 2019).

In 2006, Angeloni was replaced by three joint CEOs: Antonella de Simone, Andrea Perrone, and Antonio Bianchini. In June 2007, Angeloni and his wife sold their 17% share in the company. In 2009, Brioni was hit by the economic crisis but refused to relocate its manufacturing outside of Italy. Instead, the brand released new categories of products with new fabrics and introduced a men’s scent, the brand’s first foray into fragrances since the release of the 1958 Good Luck fragrance. Andrea Perrone took over as CEO and appointed Alessandro Dell'Acqua as creative director of womenswear in May 2010, but the brand discontinued its women’s line the following year.

The New Brioni 

In 2011, Brioni was acquired by the French luxury group PPR (renamed Kering in 2013). For the past decade, the brand had been struggling to redefine itself, the influence of streetwear and casual office wear was driving the younger clientele away from the traditional suits tailored by Brioni. Francesco Pesci, an employee of the company since 1994, acted as CEO of Brioni during the transition. In July 2012, Brendan Mullane was appointed creative director of Brioni. Mulllane experimented with silk, hand-painted fabrics, and kimono-belted suits in his collections. In 2014, the brand launched the Brioni Eau de Toilette.

In November 2014, Gianluca Flore took over as CEO of the brand. In March 2016, Justin O’Shea was appointed creative director of Brioni. O'Shea looked for a reinvention of the brand by appealing to new customers, featuring stronger shoulders, smaller waist and longer jackets. After 6 months, O'Shea left Brioni. In March 2017, Fabrizio Malverdi became the new CEO of Brioni,  and appointed Nina-Maria Nitsche as creative director in June 2017, who was credited for revitalizing Brioni. The Primo suit was introduced, a contemporary interpretation of the brand's tailoring. In July 2018, Nina-Maria Nitsche exited Brioni, her style being described as elegant yet “too safe”.

In October 2018, the Austrian designer Norbert Stumpfl was appointed Design Director of Brioni. Norbert Stumpfl introduced a more tonal suit design with enhanced sumptuous fabrics. Cashmere, silk, vicuna and suede prevailed to create a lighter informal feel to the house’s iconic yet muted suit designs.   In 2019, Mehdi  Benabadji was appointed CEO of Brioni.

Production 

In 2020, Brioni operated 30 stores, and had 1,350 employees, including 1,000 tailors in production facilities. 

Since 1985, Brioni has operated the tailoring school Scuola di Alta Sartoria located near its factory in Penne, Italy. A made-to-measure suit requires 200 tailors and quality control specialists before shipment. A Brioni!jacket requires 12,000 stitches, only 17% of which are visible externally. Garments are pressed and steamed around 80 times to lengthen the fabric.

Marketing 
Brioni has hired movie stars for its advertising campaigns including: Samuel L. Jackson and Sir Anthony Hopkins<ref>Sir Anthony Hopkins Is The Face For Brioni Fall 2017 Campaign, Daman.co.id, 1 August 2017</ref> in 2017, Harvey Keitel and Pierce Brosnan in 2018, Matt Dillon in 2019, Brad Pitt in 2020.

 Governance 

CEOs
 1990-2006: Umberto Angeloni
 2006-2009: Antonella de Simone, Andrea Perrone, Antonio Bianchini
 2009-2010: Andrea Perrone
 2010-2014: Francesco Pesci
 2014-2017: Gianluca Flore
 2017-2019: Fabrizio Malverdi
 2020-present: Mehdi Benabadji

Creative designers
 2013-2016: Brendan Mullane
 2016: Justin O’Shea
 2017-2018: Nina-Maria Nitsche
 2018-present: Norbert Stumpfl

 In  popular culture 

Brioni has dressed Pierce Brosnan in all his James Bond movies since GoldenEye (1995), and Daniel Craig in Casino Royale (2006). In the 2000 movie American Psycho, Patrick Bateman (played by Christian Bale) wears a Brioni tie.

 Further reading 

 Farid Chenoune, Brioni (Universe of Fashion), ed. Universe. 1998.
 Fernando Morelli, Lea Della Cagna and Michelle Finamore, Gaetano Savini, the Man Who Was Brioni'', ed. Assouline. 2011.

See also

 Made in Italy
 Bespoke tailoring
 Made-to-measure
 Kering
 Kiton
 Ermenegildo Zegna

References

External links 
 

Clothing brands of Italy
High fashion brands
Italian suit makers
Luxury brands
Manufacturing companies based in Rome
Clothing companies established in 1945
Design companies established in 1945
Italian companies established in 1945
Kering brands